Vladimír Filo (15 January 1940 in Gáň - 18 August 2015 in Nitra) was a Slovak Roman Catholic bishop.

Ordained to the priesthood in 1962, Filo was named auxiliary bishop of the Roman Catholic Archdiocese of Trnava, Slovakia. He was ordained bishop on 16 April 1990. In 2002, Filo was appointed coadjutor bishop of the Roman Catholic Diocese of Rožňava and then succeeded as diocesan bishop in 2008. Filo retired in 2015.

Notes

1940 births
2015 deaths
20th-century Roman Catholic bishops in Slovakia
People from Galanta District
21st-century Roman Catholic bishops in Slovakia